Typha latifolia, better known as broadleaf cattail, is a perennial herbaceous plant in the genus Typha. It is found as a native plant species in North and South America, Eurasia, and Africa.

Names 
Typha latifolia has many other names: broadleaf cattail, Bulrush, common bulrush, common cattail, cat-o'-nine-tails, great reedmace, cooper's reed, cumbungi.

Description 
Typha latifolia grows 1.5 to 3 metres (5 to 10 feet) high and it has leaves  broad. It will generally grow from 0.75 to 1 m (2 to 3 ft) of water depth.

Distribution and habitat 

It is found as a native plant species in North and South America, Eurasia, and Africa. In Canada, broadleaf cattail occurs in all provinces and also in the Yukon and Northwest Territories, and in the United States, it is native to all states except Hawaii. It is an introduced and invasive species, and is considered a noxious weed in Australia and Hawaii. It has been reported in Indonesia, Malaysia, New Zealand, Papua New Guinea, and the Philippines. It is referred to as Soli-soli in the Philippines.

The species has been found in a variety of climates, including tropical, subtropical, southern and northern temperate, humid coastal, and dry continental. It is found at elevations from sea level to 2,300 m (7,500 ft.

T. latifolia is an "obligate wetland" species, meaning that it is always found in or near water. The species generally grows in flooded areas where the water depth does not exceed , but has also been reported growing in floating mats in slightly deeper water. It grows mostly in fresh water but also occurs in slightly brackish marshes. The species can displace other species native to salt marshes upon reduction in salinity. Under such conditions the plant may be considered aggressive since it interferes with preservation of the salt marsh habitat.

T. latifolia shares its range with other related species, and hybridizes with Typha angustifolia, narrow-leaf cattail, to form Typha × glauca (T. angustifolia × T. latifolia), white cattail. Common cattail is usually found in shallower water than narrow-leaf cattail.

Uses
Traditionally, the plant has been a part of certain indigenous cultures of British Columbia, as a source of food, medicine, and for other uses. The rhizomes are edible after cooking and removing the skin, while peeled stems and leaf bases can be eaten raw or cooked. The young flower spikes, young shoots, and sprouts at the end of the rootstocks are edible as well. The pollen from the mature cones can be used as a flavoring. The starchy rootstalks are ground into meal by Native Americans.

It is not advisable to eat specimens deriving from polluted water as it absorbs pollutants and in fact is used as a bioremediator. Specimens with a very bitter or spicy taste should not be eaten.

References

External links

 ROOK description
 Edibility of Cattail – Edible parts and identification
 U. of Michigan-Dearborn: Ethnobotany

latifolia
Aquatic plants
Flora of Europe
Flora of Asia
Flora of Africa
Flora of North America
Flora of South America
Plants used in Native American cuisine
Plants used in traditional Native American medicine
Plants described in 1753
Taxa named by Carl Linnaeus